Tanrıkulu is a Turkish surname. Its meaning in the Turkish language is "Servant of God".

Notable people with this surname include:
 Ahmet Kenan Tanrıkulu (born 1958), Turkish politician
 Azize Tanrıkulu (born 1986), Turkish female taekwondo athlete
 Bahri Tanrıkulu (bron 1980), Turkish taekwondo athlete
 Dilba Tanrıkulu (born 1998), Turkish female para-athlete
 Sezgin Tanrıkulu, Turkish human rights lawyer
 Tina Tanrıkulu, formerly known as Tina Morgan (born 1982), Australian taekwondo athlete
Theophoric names